William Edward "Ed" Boykin (June 27, 1932 – November 17, 2015) was an American politician who was a Republican member of the New Mexico House of Representatives from 2001 to 2007. He attended New Mexico State University and was a teacher and academic administrator. Boykin died on November 17, 2015.

References

1932 births
2015 deaths
People from Clarendon, Texas
Politicians from Las Cruces, New Mexico
New Mexico State University alumni
Republican Party members of the New Mexico House of Representatives